Mohamed Zaghloul (born August 31, 1993) is an Egyptian freestyle wrestler. He competed in the men's freestyle 86 kg event at the 2016 Summer Olympics, in which he was eliminated in the round of 16 by Pedro Ceballos.

References

External links
 

1993 births
Living people
Egyptian male sport wrestlers
Olympic wrestlers of Egypt
Wrestlers at the 2016 Summer Olympics